Sepoy (foaled 27 September 2008) is a multiple Group 1 winning Australian Thoroughbred racehorse who is most notable for winning the 2011 Golden Slipper.

Background

Sepoy is a home-bred horse of Darley Stud by world record-breaking stallion Elusive Quality out of the Danehill mare Watchful.  Watchful is the full sister to Camarena, winner of the Group 1 Queensland Derby who in turn is the dam of   Sires' Produce.

Racing career

Sepoy became the first horse since Rancher (1982) and Bel Esprit (2002) to win all three legs of the Blue Diamond series as a two-year-old.

Sepoy went on to win 10 of his 13 starts, including 4 at Group 1 level.

Sepoy would become Australian Champion Two Year Old in 2011 and Australian Champion Three Year Old Colt/Gelding in 2012.

Stud career
 
Sepoy acted as a shuttle stallion for Darley Stud between both the northern and southern hemispheres.

Sepoy was retired from stud duty after the 2021 breeding season and will spend his retirement at Woodlands Stud in the Hunter region of New South Wales.

Notable progeny

c = colt, f = filly, g = gelding

Pedigree

References

Racehorses bred in Australia
Racehorses trained in Australia
2008 racehorse births